The Urgent Hangman is a 1938 thriller novel by the British writer Peter Cheyney. It introduced the fictional London-based private detective Slim Callaghan, the first in a series of seven novels as well as two short story collections.

Adaptations
In 1952 it was adapted for the stage by Gerald Verner as Meet Mr. Callaghan and ran for 340 performances at the Garrick Theatre in London's West End. The play was in turn adapted for the 1954 film Meet Mr. Callaghan directed by Charles Saunders and starring Derrick De Marney and Adrienne Corri.

References

Bibliography
Reilly, John M. Twentieth Century Crime & Mystery Writers. Springer, 2015. p. 300. . .

1938 British novels
Novels by Peter Cheyney
British thriller novels
British novels adapted into plays
British novels adapted into films
Novels set in London
William Collins, Sons books